Yang Weidong (born 1974) is a Chinese entrepreneur who served as CEO of Youku Tudou from 2016 to 2018 and CEO of AliMusic from May 2018 to December 2018.

Biography
Born in 1974, Yang graduated from Hohai University. He joined Nokia Corporation in 2009, and several years later promoted to the Marketing Director position. On June 1, 2012 he joined the MaxTimes and worked there until 28 February 2013. In March 2013, he was recruited by Gu Yongqiang  as vice-president and then president of Tudou, where he was promoted to CEO of Youku Tudou in November 2015. In October 2016, Alibaba Cultural Entertainment Group was set up, Yang was appointed CEO of Great Youku Business Group. In May 2018, he concurrently served as CEO of AliMusic. On December 4, 2018, he is being investigated by the police because of economic problems. He was replaced by Fan Luyuan.

References

1974 births
Living people
Hohai University alumni
21st-century Chinese businesspeople
Alibaba Group people
Chinese computer businesspeople